The 2004 Giro di Lombardia was the 98th edition of the Giro di Lombardia cycle race and was held on 16 October 2004. The race started in Mendrisio and finished in Bergamo. The race was won by Damiano Cunego of the Saeco team.

General classification

References

2004
Giro di Lombardia
Giro di Lombardia
2004 UCI Road World Cup
October 2004 sports events in Europe